Prosiopesis (from Classical Greek, προσιώπησις, "becoming silent") is a term coined by Otto Jespersen for pronouncing a word or phrase without vocalizing its initial sounds. One example Jespersen gave is for "Good morning" to be shortened to "Morning". Jesperson introduced the idea in Language, Its Nature, Development, and Origin (ASIN B0007DEMMW; 1922); he also discusses it in The Philosophy of Grammar (reprint 1992). Prosiopesis is studied as a mode for originating interjections, which can shed light on their meaning.

This is similar to aposiopesis, where the ending of a sentence is deliberately excluded.

External links
Secondary Interjections in English, Mayumi Nishikawa of Setsunan University; 9th International Pragmatics Conference, International Pragmatics Association, 2005 (abstract)
Parataxis in Pirahã, Mark Liberman of the University of Pennsylvania, casual discussion on Language Log

Pragmatics
Historical linguistics